MoonLIGHT, also called Lunar Laser Ranging Retroreflector Array for the 21st Century (LLRRA-21), is a laser retroreflector to be deployed near the lunar south pole region. The reflector was planned to be launched in July 2020 as a secondary payload on the MX-1E lunar lander built by the private company Moon Express. However, as of February 2020, the launch of the MX-1E has been canceled. The fate of MoonLIGHT is unknown.

The laser-ranging experiment was developed as a collaboration primarily between the University of Maryland in the United States, and the Italian National Laboratories of Frascati to complement and expand on the Lunar Laser Ranging experiment started with the Apollo Program in 1969.

Overview

The principle of this laser ranging is based on laser pulses sent from a telescope on Earth to the retroreflector array on the Moon. The retroreflector (mirrors) send the pulse straight back to the originating telescope where the round trip time—and therefore the exact distance—is recorded. The reflector arrays are designed to allow more accurate measurements from Earth that will increase lunar mapping accuracy, will test principles of Einstein's general theory of relativity, and other theories of gravity.  Researchers think these studies may also help understand the nature of dark energy.

MoonLIGHT is a laser reflecting array to be deployed near the lunar south pole region. It was developed as a collaboration primarily between the University of Maryland and the Italian National Laboratories of Frascati. Additional partners and collaborators include the Italian Space Agency's Matera Laser Ranging Observatory, the University of Hannover (Germany), and the Czech Technical University (Czech Republic). The experiment and agreement between the collaborators was announced on 15 May 2015.

The reflector was planned to be a secondary payload on the MX-1E lunar lander built by Moon Express, which was  planned to be launched in 2020 with an Electron rocket. An unrelated planned science payload on the same lander was the International Lunar Observatory. The MX-1E lander was planned to land on the Malapert Mountain, a 5 km tall peak in the Aitken Basin region that has an uninterrupted direct line of sight to Earth. The launch contract between Moon Express and Rocket Lab (manufacturer of Electron) was canceled sometime before February 2020. Moon Express does not, as of February 2020, anymore plan to launch MX-1E on an Electron rocket, thus leaving MX-1E and all its science payloads without a carrier rocket. This leaves the fate of the science payloads hanging in the air.

This experiment will complement and advance the retroreflector experiments begun with Apollo 11 in 1969. The team claims to have developed a new approach and technology that would increase the ranging accuracy by a factor of 100 by using new technology and methods to correct for libration and the thermal behavior and the optical performance.

See also
List of retroreflectors on the Moon
Satellite laser ranging

References

External links
"Theory and Model for the New Generation of the Lunar Laser Ranging Data" by Sergei Kopeikin
Apollo 15 Experiments – Laser Ranging Retroreflector by the Lunar and Planetary Institute

Lunar science
Tests of general relativity
Spacecraft instruments
International science experiments